Koblentz is a municipality in the Vorpommern-Greifswald district, in Mecklenburg-Vorpommern, Germany.

Climate
Köppen-Geiger climate classification system classifies its climate as oceanic (Cfb).

References

Vorpommern-Greifswald